= Bionix Radiation Therapy =

American Medical device company

Bionix Radiation Therapy, LLC
- Industry: Health care
- Founded: 1984
- Founder: Doctor Andrew Milligan and Doctor James Huttner
- Headquarters: Toledo, Ohio, United States
- Website: www.bionixrt.com

Bionix Radiation Therapy, LLC is an American medical device company known for manufacturing radiation oncology device.

== History ==
Headquartered in Toledo, Ohio, USA, Bionix Radiation Therapy was founded in 1984 as Bionix Development Corporation by Doctor Andrew Milligan and Doctor James Huttner. In 2016, the companies split to become Bionix Radiation Therapy, LLC and Bionix Development Corporation.

== Products and services ==
Bionix Radiation Therapy, LLC offers medical devices including patient immobilization devices for treating cancer using external beam. The company supplies such devices for cancer clinics, radiotherapy centers and medical oncology practices.

== See also ==
- Radiation therapy
